Antipope Clement VIII should not be confused with Pope Clement VIII.

Gil Sánchez Muñoz y Carbón, was one of the Avignon antipopes, reigning from 10 June 1423 to 26 July 1429 as Clement VIII. He was born in Teruel between 1369–1370 and a member of the Avignon curia. When Alfonso V of Aragon reached an agreement with Pope Martin V, Sánchez Muñoz abdicated, made his submission and was appointed bishop of Mallorca. He died on 28 December 1446.

Biography
He was a friend and advisor of the future Avignon anti-pope Benedict XIII, and member of the Avignon curia. In 1396 he was an envoy to the Bishop of Valencia to get Spanish support. Benedict had appointed four cardinals, and on his death, three of them, on 10 June 1423, elected Sánchez Muñoz as Pope. The fourth, Jean Carrier, absent at the time, declared the election invalid, and elected his own antipope in turn, who took the name Benedict XIV. Consequently, Jean Carrier was excommunicated by Clement VIII.

Clement VIII's fate was bound up with the ambitions of Alfonso V of Aragon. Alfonso wished to negotiate for Naples, and so gave Clement support; his queen Maria of Castile, and the Aragonese bishops supported Martin V. In the summer of 1423 Alfonso persuaded the Republic of Siena to acknowledge Clement VIII, thus securing recognition for the pope of the Avignon line in the very city, Pavia, which was part of the Republic of Siena, where the Roman pope Martin V had convened an ecumenical council of the Church.

However, through the exertions of Cardinal Pierre de Foix, an able diplomat and relation of the king’s, an agreement was reached between Alfonso and the Pope. Alfonso then sent a delegation in 1428 (headed by Alfonso de Borgia, the future Callixtus III), to persuade Clement to recognise Martin. Clement declared his abdication on 26 July 1429 and had his cardinals elect Oddo di Colonna (Martin V) his successor, a formal act precluding future doubts concerning apostolic succession. His abdication was confirmed in mid-August. Clement had to make a penitential submission in forma to Martin V, and when this was done Martin granted Sánchez Muñoz the Bishopric of Mallorca.  Sánchez Muñoz died on 28 December 1446.

See also
 Papal selection before 1059
 Papal conclave (since 1274)

References

Clement VIII
Clement 08
1369 births
15th-century antipopes